Dragan de Lazare is an international pen name of Dragan Lazarević (born 8 May 1964), a Serbian cartoonist, comic book and comic strip artist, illustrator and scriptwriter.

Biography
He was born in Rio de Janeiro, and grew up in Yugoslavia and France. He debuted in Yugoslav comics industry when he was 17, becoming a member of "Beogradski krug 2" artistic group.

He lives in Belgrade.

Comics  
 Une aventure de Yves Rokatansky, written by Lazar Odanović alias Lazzaro, Sorg
 Le témoin, 1989.

 Les mémoires troubles, 1993.
 Fenêtre sur rue, 1994.
 Le second témoin, 1995.
 Serial killer, 1996.
 La disparue d'Halloween, 1997.
 America, 1998.
 Devoirs de vacances, 2000.
 96 heures, 2002.

 Acidités de couleur noire, with BAM and Odanović, YIL Editions, 2016.

References

External links
 Dragan de Lazare sur Bedetheque 
 "Acidités de couleur noire", official site 
 De Lazare, Dragan. Blogografija: BAMova strip avantura, 2015. (sr)

1964 births
Living people
Serbian comics artists
Serbian comics writers
Serbian cartoonists
Serbian illustrators
People from Rio de Janeiro (city)
Artists from Belgrade